The Drebach Observatory (lit. "Drehbach Popular Observatory") is a planetarium and astronomical observatory (obs. code: 113) located in the municipality of Drebach, in Saxony, Germany. The planetarium uses a ZKP-3 Skymaster Zeiss projector. The observatory is equipped with a 50-centimetre Cassegrain reflector.

Description 
The Drebach Observatory is a non-profit cultural and educational institution in the center of the municipality of Drebach. Located in the Erzgebirgskreis – named after the Erzgebirge mountain range ("Ore Mountains") – a district in the Free State of Saxony, Germany, the observatory is not far from the border to the Czech Republic. The primary school "David Rebentrost" and the sports field are in the immediate vicinity of the facility.

Gallery

See also

External links 

 Drebach Planetarium 

Buildings and structures in Saxony
Planetaria in Germany
Tourist attractions in Saxony
Education in Saxony
Minor-planet discovering observatories